is a paralympic athlete from Japan competing mainly in category T34 sprint events.

Kazuya first competed in the 1996 Summer Paralympics in the 400m.  In the 2000 Summer Paralympics he won three medals, a gold in 400m, silver in the 200m and bronze in the 100m.

References

Paralympic athletes of Japan
Athletes (track and field) at the 1996 Summer Paralympics
Athletes (track and field) at the 2000 Summer Paralympics
Paralympic gold medalists for Japan
Paralympic silver medalists for Japan
Paralympic bronze medalists for Japan
Living people
Medalists at the 2000 Summer Paralympics
Year of birth missing (living people)
Paralympic medalists in athletics (track and field)